JSW Steel Limited is an Indian multinational steel producer based in Mumbai and is a flagship company of the JSW Group. After the merger of ISPAT Steel and Jindal Vijayanagar Steel Limited, JSW Steel became India's second largest private sector steel company.

History 
JSW Steel's history can be traced back to 1982, when the Jindal Group acquired Piramal Steel Limited, which operated a mini steel mill at Tarapur in Maharashtra and renamed it as Jindal Iron and Steel Company (JISCO). Soon after the acquisition the group set up its first steel plant in 1982 at Vasind, near Mumbai.

It is well connected to both the Mormugao Port and Chennai Port and is 340 kilometres from Bangalore. It is said to be the sixth largest steel plant in the world.

In the year 2005, JISCO and JVSL merged to form JSW Steel Limited. It also set up a plant at Salem with an annual capacity of 1 million tonnes.

As of October 2022, the installed manufacturing capacity of the company is 28.5 MTPA.

Merger and acquisitions 
In 2007, JSW Steel formed a joint venture for a steel plant in Georgia. Any by 2020, it sold of 39 percent stake which it held in JV to Georgian Steel Group Holdings Limited.

In 2009, Japan's JFE Steel Corp, entered into a strategic partnership with JSW Steel to produce automotive steel products.

In 2010, JSW Steel acquired 3 MTPA Hot Rolling Plant in Dolvi, Maharashtra (formerly Ispat Industries Limited).

in 2012, JSW Ispat Steel was merged with JSW Steel, 20 months after the latter acquired a controlling stake in Ispat Industries.

In 2014, it acquired Welspun Maxsteel Limited in a deal valued at around INR 1,000 Crores.

In 2019, JSW Steel acquired Bhushan Power & Steel. This resulted in the absorption of an integrated steel facility in Jharsuguda, with a capacity of 2.5 million tonnes annually.

In  April 2021, the company acquired Plate and Coil Mill Division (PCMD) of Welspun Corp for a sum of ₹848.5 cr.

In October 2021, JSW Steel acquired 51% stake in Neotrex Steel from JSW Group promoters and entered into an under-construction project to manufacture Low Relaxation Prestressed Concrete (LRPC).

In October 2022, JSW Steel initiated a process to acquire Central-India based National Steel & Agro (NSAIL) through resolution plan submitted under the corporate insolvency resolution process. The company makes flat steel products such as cold-rolled coil, galvanised corrugated sheets, colour coil and pre-painted profile sheets and owes lenders over Rs 1,600 crore.

In January 2023, JSW Steel entered into an agreement via one of its subsidiary to acquire 31 percent stake in startup Ayena Innovation which deals in home furnishings and interior decoration sector.

Mining acquisitions 
In the past, JSW Steel has additionally acquired mining assets in the United States, the Republic of Chile, and Mozambique.

Carbon footprint
JSW Steel reported Total CO2e emissions (Direct + Indirect) for the twelve months ending 31 March 2020 at 40,522 Kt (-5,326 /-11.6% y-o-y). There is no evidence of a consistent declining trend as yet.

References

External links
 
 Business data for JSW Steel Ltd: Reuters Google Finance BloombergQuint

Steel companies of India
Manufacturing companies based in Mumbai
JSW Group
Manufacturing companies established in 1982
Indian companies established in 1982
NIFTY 50
Recipients of the Rashtriya Khel Protsahan Puruskar
1982 establishments in Maharashtra
Companies listed on the National Stock Exchange of India
Companies listed on the Bombay Stock Exchange